Cephas Zhuwao (born 15 December 1984) is a Zimbabwean international cricketer. He bats left-handed and bowls slow left arm orthodox spin.

Zhuwao made his first-class debut for Northerns in May 2007, having made his limited-overs debut in January 2006.

Despite having played well against a Pakistan academy side, he was a surprise selection for the Zimbabwean national side in October 2008. He made his International Twenty20 debut in the 2008 Quadrangular Twenty20 Series in Canada against Canada, also playing against Pakistan. Played as an opening batsman, he scored twelve runs in three innings. Even though he bowled just two balls in the tournament, he took the final wicket of the third-place playoff against Canada in a 109-run victory.

Following this tournament, Zhuwao made his One Day International (ODI) debut against Ireland on 17 October 2008 in Nairobi, Kenya. Again opening the innings, he scored 16 runs in a 156-run victory.

In November 2017, he scored his maiden first-class century, batting for Mashonaland Eagles against Mid West Rhinos in the 2017–18 Logan Cup. He finished as the leading run-scorer for the tournament, with 821 runs in seven matches.

In February 2018, almost ten years after his one and only ODI appearance to date, Zhuwao was added to Zimbabwe's squad for the 2018 Cricket World Cup Qualifier. In September 2018, he was named in Zimbabwe's squad for the 2018 Africa T20 Cup tournament. In December 2020, he was selected to play for the Southern Rocks in the 2020–21 Logan Cup.

References

External links 

1984 births
Living people
Zimbabwean cricketers
Zimbabwe Twenty20 International cricketers
Zimbabwe One Day International cricketers
Cricketers from Harare